The Daily Edited (TDE) is an Australian luxury fashion brand, specialising in monogrammable leather goods. It is based in Sydney, Australia, but is available both online and through stores in Australia, Singapore and the USA. It sells embossed and personalised women's and men's leather goods, stationery and desk accessories, including bags, pouches, clutches, wallets, phone cases, diaries and overnight bags. The TDE brand is known for its focus on individuality and personalisation, reflecting its ethos that “you can make it your own”.

In November 2022, the company was put up for sale after going through a liquidation stage.

History 
The Daily Edited was founded by Alyce Tran and Tania Liu while the two were working as lawyers at the Allens law firm in Perth, Australia. It was initially launched on Instagram in 2011 as a lifestyle blog and fashion label, before rearticulating itself as an online leather goods brand in August 2014. It soon expanded, selling personalised leather goods through in-store through a partnership with David Jones, in Sydney, Melbourne, Adelaide, and Brisbane. They have opened stand alone Flagship stores at Chadstone Shopping Centre in Melbourne, Pitt Street Mall in Sydney's CBD  and on Bleecker Street in New York. They have a new flagship store opening in the Queen Victoria Building in Sydney’s CBD in 2021. In the past the brand has also partnered with department stores in Singapore at Robinsons and Tangs.

Notable brand representatives 
Lara Bingle, an Australian model and media personality, was featured in TDE's Summer Christmas campaign in December 2015.

The American model Hailey Baldwin collaborated with The Daily Edited in 2016, promoting a collection labeled as #theHAILEYedited.

In 2017 the Stallone Sisters, Sistine, Sophia, and Scarlet, the three daughters of movie star Sylvester Stallone, were featured in the #MeetTheStallones campaign promoting a new capsule collection for TDE.

Most recently US actor and supermodel Amber Valletta was featured in the Amber In Residence campaign for the brand.

References

External links 
 

Fashion accessory brands
Australian companies established in 2014
Luxury brands
High fashion brands